Al-Difaa Al-Madani Sport Club, is an Iraqi football team based in Al-Shaab, Baghdad, that plays in the Iraq Division One and Iraq FA Cup.

History
Al-Difaa Al-Madani Sport Club was founded in 2005 by Ministry of Defence. The club didn't have a headquarters until 2017, when they rehabilitated one of the war shelters to turn it into a club headquarters, they played in the Iraq FA Cup in 2015–16 season, the team played their first match against Al-Mahmoudiyah FC and beat him, but they were in the 32nd round facing Al-Zawraa, the league champions that season and lost the match. The club played in Iraq Division One in 2017–18 season and almost qualified for Iraqi Premier League in 2018 season, but in the final lost against Erbil, the Iraqi champions for three seasons in the last ten years and Erbil is qualified.

Personnel

Board members

{| class="toccolours"
!bgcolor=silver|Position
!bgcolor=silver|Name
!bgcolor=silver|Nationality
|-bgcolor=#eeeeee
|President:||Adel Al-Hurr Lazim||
|-
|Vice-president:||Jabbar Mohsin||
|-bgcolor=#eeeeee
|Secretary:||Akram Wali||
|-
|Treasurer:||Basheer Abdul Sada||
|-bgcolor=#eeeeee
|Member of the Board:||Vacant||
|-

Managerial history
  Haider Jabbar
  Mahdi Kadhim
  Adel Ajar

See also
 2015–16 Iraq FA Cup
 2016–17 Iraq FA Cup

References

External links
 Al-Difaa Al-Madani profile at kooora.com (in Arabic)

Football clubs in Baghdad
Sport in Baghdad